WFMZ (104.9 MHz) is an FM radio station broadcasting an urban contemporary format. Licensed to Hertford, North Carolina, United States, it serves Northeast North Carolina along with parts of the Hampton Roads area. The station is owned by East Carolina Radio, Inc. Its studios are located at 907 B West Ehringhaus Street in Elizabeth City, NC.

History
The station started in 1988, a construction permit was granted to Maranatha Broadcasting for WFMZ but it would not sign on until 1991. It was a Christian Contemporary station known as Praise 105 from 1991 to 2003. It was sold to Convergent Broadcasting in mid-June 2003. It became Classic Hits 104.9 on September 2, 2003, just after 6 am. The first song on Classic Hits 104.9 was "Hotel California" by The Eagles.

In 2006, Convergent Broadcasting LLC sold WFMZ, WYND-FM, WVOD and WZPR to CapSan Media LLC.

Starting May 14, 2009, WFMZ began simulcasting on WZPR 92.3 FM.

Hengooch, LLC bought WZPR, WFMZ, WYND-FM and WVOD in 2010 for $200,000.

On December 5, 2012, due to WOBR-FM relaunching as "The Pirate", WFMZ tweaked their format to classic rock and rebranded as "Classic Rock 104.9 & 92.3".

Max Radio of the Carolinas operates WZPR/WFMZ, WCMS-FM and WCXL as of 2013; WYND-FM was sold.

On May 18, 2018, East Carolina Radio bought WFMZ from Hengooch LLC for $150,000. On August 17, 2018, WFMZ went off the air after East Carolina Radio closed on the sale the day prior. WFMZ returned to the air to do a temporary simulcast of sister station WRSF on November 7 until the 21st. On June 3, 2019, at 5 pm, WFMZ returned to simulcast WKJX. The WKJX programming moved over to WFMZ fully on June 24, 2019, when WKJX transitioned to a hot adult contemporary format.

History of call letters
The call letters WFMZ were previously assigned to an FM station in Allentown, Pennsylvania.

References

External links

WFMZ Changes from Christian Contemporary To Classic Hits

FMZ
Radio stations established in 1991
1991 establishments in North Carolina
Urban contemporary radio stations in the United States